Harrie Gommans (born 20 February 1983) is a Dutch former professional footballer who played as a striker.

Career
Born in Roermond, Gommans began his senior career during the 2000–01 season with Fortuna Sittard, and has also played for Excelsior, Westerlo, MVV, Vitesse Arnhem, Roda JC and Roeselare.

External links
 Profile at Voetbal International 

1983 births
Living people
People from Roermond
Association football forwards
Dutch footballers
Dutch expatriate footballers
Fortuna Sittard players
Excelsior Rotterdam players
K.V.C. Westerlo players
S.K. Beveren players
MVV Maastricht players
SBV Vitesse players
Roda JC Kerkrade players
Eredivisie players
Eerste Divisie players
Belgian Pro League players
Challenger Pro League players
Expatriate footballers in Belgium
Footballers from Limburg (Netherlands)
Dutch expatriate sportspeople in Belgium